Deborah Beth Zamble (October 5, 1971 – July 6, 2020) was a Canadian chemist and Canada Research Chair in Biological Chemistry at the University of Toronto. Her research considered how bacteria processed metal nutrients.

Early life and education 
Zamble was born in Kingston, Ontario. She attended the University of Toronto for her undergraduate studies, where she worked in the lab of the Bibudhendra Sarkar. Zamble was a graduate student at the Massachusetts Institute of Technology, where she worked with Stephen J. Lippard on cisplatin, an anti-cancer drug. Her research considered the role of p53 in the cellular response to the drug. Zamble was a postdoctoral fellow at the Harvard Medical School, where she worked alongside Christopher T. Walsh. At the Harvard Medical School Zamble worked on the microcin B17 synthetase.

Research and career 
Zamble returned to Canada in 2001, where she was made a Canada Research Chair in Biological Chemistry. Here she investigated how bacteria process metal nutrients, with a focus on the uptake of nickel. Transition metals are essential to the structure and function of biological systems, but can be toxic if they are allowed to accumulate. To mitigate this, cells make use of metalloproteins to regulate the use of each metal. In particular, Zamble studies the bacteria Escherichia coli and Helicobacter pylori.

Academic service 
Zamble served on the executive board of the Royal Canadian Institute. She served on the editorial boards of the Journal of Biological Chemistry and Metallomics. Zamble was involved with recreating the biological chemistry curriculum at the University of Toronto, leading a second year course that incorporated her enthusiasm for cooking.

Awards and honours 

 1993 University of Toronto College Science Medal
 2001 Canada Research Chair in Biological Chemistry
 2002 Premier's Research and Excellence Awards
 2007 Sloan Research Fellowship
 2009 NSERC Discovery Accelerator Research Award
 2012 Queen Elizabeth Diamond Jubilee Medal

Selected publications

Personal life 
On July 6, 2020, Zamble died of an unexpected brain haemorrhage.

References 

1971 births
2020 deaths
University of Toronto alumni
Massachusetts Institute of Technology School of Science alumni
Harvard Medical School faculty
Academic staff of the University of Toronto
Canadian women chemists
20th-century Canadian chemists
20th-century Canadian women scientists
21st-century Canadian chemists
21st-century Canadian women scientists